General Hospital was a British daytime soap opera produced by ATV that ran on ITV from 1972 to 1979. General Hospital was an attempt to replicate the success of one of British television's first major soap operas, Emergency – Ward 10. The original theme music was "Girl in the White Dress" by the Derek Scott Orchestra which was used until 1975, when it was replaced by Johnny Pearson's "Red Alert" for the 60-minute episodes.

History

In 1972, ITV started to broadcast programmes on weekday afternoons, triggering a new wave of productions to fill in the extended schedules. Among the first of these shows, which were aimed at giving advertisers access to housewives, were the long-running rural soap Emmerdale Farm (YTV) and the twice-weekly medical drama General Hospital.

Set in a fictional Midlands town, the series followed the romantic and professional lives of its doctors and nurses. While the location and the characters names had been changed, in most other respects General Hospital was almost identical to its predecessor, Emergency – Ward 10, a deliberate attempt to recreate its success.

In 1975, after 270 twice-weekly episodes, General Hospital was given a prime time slot on Friday evening. The move saw the episode lengths double from 30 to 60 minutes, with each episode being more self-contained, while on-screen medical procedures, including detailed scenes of surgery, became more prominent.

Amongst the regular cast of the series was actor Tony Adams who played Doctor Neville Bywaters; he also appeared as Adam Chance in Crossroads. Among the other familiar faces to appear was Lynda Bellingham, who later was later cast as the mother in a series of commercials for Oxo stock cubes, and later as Helen Herriot in the series All Creatures Great and Small, based on the books by James Herriot. Other regulars included Carmen Munroe, who was also a regular presenter in the Play School children's programme team; and a young Sally Knyvette, who went on to appear in Blake's 7 and Emmerdale Farm.

By 1979, the "homely" feel of General Hospital was considered to be old-fashioned in the wake of newer, grittier dramas, and it was cancelled. Many episodes are missing from television archives.

Cast list
 Lewis Jones as Mr William Parker-Brown, Consultant in trauma medicine and executive director
 David Garth as Dr Matthew Armstrong, Consultant in emergency medicine and clinical lead
 James Kerry as Dr Martin Baxter, Consultant in emergency medicine
 Ian White as Dr Peter Ridge, Consultant in emergency medicine
 Lynda Bellingham as Nurse Hilda Price, Senior sister/emergency nurse practitioner/clinical nurse manager
 Barbara Kellerman Nurse Laura Hardy
 Judy Buxton as Student Nurse Katy Shaw, Student nurse
 Peggy Sinclair as Sister Ellen Chapman, Sister
 Tony Adams as Dr Neville Bywaters, Consultant paediactrician
 Eric Lander as Dr Richard Kirby, Specialist registrar in emergency medicine
 Patricia Maynard as Dr Joanna Whitworth, Senior house officer
 Pippa Reid as Sister Doreen Holland, Sister
 John Halstead as Arnold Capper, Porter
 Monica Grey as Sister Edwards, Chaplain
 Jason Rose as Dr Herbert Chipato, Consultant general surgeon
 Carmen Munroe as Sister Frances Washington, Sister
 Carl Rigg as Dr Gregory Knight, Consultant cardiothoracic surgeon
 Tom Adams as Mr Guy Wallman, Consultant general surgeon/CEO
 Sally Knyvette as Nurse Rowland
 Amber Thomas as Nurse Stevens
 Donal Cox as Dr Donald Morley
 Veronica Hurst as Dr Hamlyn
 Harold Kasket as Dr Sterne
 Petra Davies as Dr Petra Hunt
 Ronald Leigh-Hunt as Dr Robert Thorne
 Jenny Twigge as Dr Wadham
 Rosemary Nicols as Dr Lacey
 Jane How as Nurse Preston
 Jonathan Dennis as Dr Rogers
 John Line as Dr Robertson
 Jean Rimmer as Sister Harrington
 Pamela Allen as Sister Bellamy

DVD Releases

In August 2012 a DVD of the surviving episodes from the original 270 twice-weekly version of the show was released under the banner Series 1.  The DVD includes episodes 1, 2, 3*, 4, 6*, 7*, 8*, 9*, 10*, 11*, 12*, 13*, 15*, 16*, 17*, 18*, 19*, 21*, 22*, 23*, 24*, 25*, 26*, 29, 32, 100, 126, 231, 232, 233, 234, 235, 236, 237, 238, 239, 240, 258 (episodes marked with a "*" were made in colour but now only survive in Black and White).

A second volume containing the first prime time series was due for release in April 2013 but did not appear.

As of 15 July 2021, a few selected episodes from the series are available on BritBox, a subscription only service curated by the BBC and ITV. https://www.itv.com/presscentre/britbox/press-releases/britbox-july-2021-highlights

References

External links

1970s British television soap operas
1972 British television series debuts
1979 British television series endings
British television soap operas
ITV soap operas
Television series by ITV Studios
1970s British medical television series
English-language television shows
Television shows produced by Associated Television (ATV)
Television shows shot at ATV Elstree Studios